Nationality words link to articles with information on the nation's poetry or literature (for instance, Irish or France).

Events
 July 21 – Greenock Burns Club established to honour the memory of Scottish poet Robert Burns (died 1796).
 The second edition of Specimens of the Early English Poets, edited by George Ellis and covering poems from the Old English through to the 17th century, is influential in acquainting the general reading public with Middle English poetry, going through a further 4 editions.
 Hindusthani Press established in Calcutta, India by John Gilchrist.

Works published in English

United Kingdom
 Lucy Aikin, editor and contributor, Poetry for Children, includes poems by John Dryden, Alexander Pope and Anna Barbauld (anthology)
 William Lisle Bowles, The Sorrows of Switzerland
 Sir James Burges, Richard the First
 Robert Burns, Poems Ascribed to Robert Burns (posthumous)
 Hannah Cowley, The Siege of Acre
 George Dyer, Poems
 George Ellis, ed., Specimens of the Early English Poets, 2nd edition
 Matthew Gregory Lewis, editor, Tales of Wonder, anthology of fantasy and horror poetry, London: "Printed by W. Bulmer...for the Author"
 James Hogg, Scottish Pastorals, Poems, Songs
 Thomas Moore:
 Corruption and Intolerance, published anonymously
 The Poetical Works of the Late Thomas Little
 Henry James Pye, Alfred
 William Barnes Rhodes, The Satires of Juvenal
 Robert Southey, Thalaba the Destroyer
 William Wordsworth and Samuel Taylor Coleridge, Lyrical Ballads, with Other Poems, 2nd edition, including "Preface to the Lyrical Ballads", two volumes; first volume, under Wordsworth's name but containing poems by Coleridge, published in January 1801, although book states "1800"

United States
 Paul Allen, Original Poems, Serious and Entertaining
 St. John Honeywood, Poems by St. John Honeywood ... With Some Pieces in Prose, New York: T. & J. Swords, United States
 John Blair Linn, The Powers of Genius, popular poem with heroic couplets in three parts
 Jonathan Mitchell Sewall, Miscellaneous Poems, many of them patriotic and political, including "Profiles of Eminent Men"
 Isaac Story, A Parnassian Shop, Opened in the Pindaric Stile, by Peter Quince, Esq., satirical verses against the Democratic Republicans, written in the style of "Peter Pindar" (John Wolcot)

Works published in other languages

Indian subcontinent
 Vinayaka Bhatta, Angreja Candrika, Sanskrit poem on the glory of the British
 Mal (Jaina poet), Satbandhava Rasa, long, narrative Gujarati-language poem
 Krishna Kaur Mishra, Sriyanka, Sanskrit epic in 16 cantos about the early history of the Sikhs

Births
Death years link to the corresponding "[year] in poetry" article:
 March 14 (March 2 O.S.) – Kristjan Jaak Peterson (died 1822), "father of Estonian poetry"
 February 21 – John Henry Newman (died 1890), English Roman Catholic cardinal, theologian, author and poet
 February 22 – William Barnes (died 1886), English writer, poet, minister, and philologist
 June 24 – Caroline Clive, also known as "Caroline Wigley Clive" (died 1873), English
 date unknown 
Kaviyo Ramnath (died about 1879), Indian, Rajasthani-language poet
Cynthia Taggart (died 1849), American poet

Deaths
Birth years link to the corresponding "[year] in poetry" article:
 January 2 – Johann Kaspar Lavater (born 1741), Swiss clergyman, philosopher, writer and poet
 January 9 – Margaretta Faugères (born 1771, American playwright, poet and political activist
 February 6 – Annis Boudinot Stockton (born 1736), American poet and sponsor of literary salons
 February 23 – Elizabeth Graeme Fergusson (born 1737), American poet and sponsor of literary salons
 March 14 – Ignacy Krasicki (born 1735), Polish Enlightenment poet ("the Prince of Poets"), Poland's La Fontaine, author of the first Polish novel, playwright, journalist, encyclopedist and translator from French and Greek
 March 25 – Friedrich von Hardenberg (born 1772), German writer, poet, mystic, philosopher and civil engineer
 March 25 – Novalis (born 1772), writer, poet and philosopher of early German Romanticism
 May 10 – Richard Gall (born 1776), Scottish
 August 11 – Félix María de Samaniego (born 1745), Spanish
 November 5 – Motoori Norinaga 本居宣長 (born 1730), Japanese Edo period scholar of Kokugaku, physician and poet
 December 23 – James Hurdis (born 1763), English clergyman and poet
 Also:
 Jean Glover (born 1758), Scottish poet and singer, died in Ireland
 Lemuel Hopkins (born 1750), American

See also

 List of years in poetry
 List of years in literature
 19th century in literature
 19th century in poetry
 Romantic poetry
 Golden Age of Russian Poetry (1800–1850)
 Weimar Classicism period in Germany, commonly considered to have begun in 1788  and to have ended either in 1805, with the death of Friedrich Schiller, or 1832, with the death of Goethe
 List of poets
 Poetry

Notes

 "A Timeline of English Poetry" Web page of the Representative Poetry Online Web site, University of Toronto

19th-century poetry
Poetry